The 1984 Army Cadets football team was an American football team that represented the United States Military Academy in the 1984 NCAA Division I-A football season. In their second season under head coach Jim Young, the Cadets compiled an 8–3–1 record and outscored their opponents by a combined total of 320 to 218.  In the annual Army–Navy Game, the Cadets defeated Navy by a 28–11 score.  The Cadets also defeated Michigan State, 10–6, in the 1984 Cherry Bowl.

Schedule

Personnel

Season summary

Colgate

at Tennessee

Duke

Harvard

vs Rutgers

Penn

at Syracuse

Air Force

at Boston College

vs Montana

vs Navy

Army's first win versus Navy since 1977
Nate Sassaman – 25 Rush, 154 Yards (finished with over 1,000 yards for the season)

Cherry Bowl (vs. Michigan State)

References

Army
Army Black Knights football seasons
Army Cadets football